Zain Farooqi is a US-based movie producer who produced Na Band Na Baraati and Money Back Guarantee.

Career 
Farooqi holds a degree in Accounting and Finance from The University of Houston, Texas. He began his career in entertainment way back in 2004. He later founded Zashko Entertainment (ZSK), through which he produces and distributes movies.

References

External links
 Zashko Entertainment website
 

Living people
American film producers
University of Houston alumni
Pakistani film producers
Year of birth missing (living people)